Tell Aalaq is an archaeological site 3k west of Rayak in the Beqaa Mohafazat (Governorate). It dates at least to the Neolithic or Chalcolithic.

References

Baalbek District
Neolithic settlements
Bronze Age sites in Lebanon